Eucosma getonia is a species of moth from the family Tortricidae. It is found in China (Hebei, Inner Mongolia), Mongolia and Russia.

References

Moths described in 1972
Eucosmini